Little Women II: Jo's Boys, also known as  is a 1993 Japanese animated television series based on Louisa May Alcott's Little Men, produced by Nippon Animation. The title is taken from Jo's Boys, the title of the sequel to Little Men, on which the series is also partially based.

The series is the sequel to the studio's 1987 Tales of Little Women, an adaptation of Alcott's novel of the same name.

Plot
Josephine March has grown into womanhood about ten years since Tales of Little Women and is now married to the German Professor, Friedrich Bhaer.  In the Plumfield farm-house that Aunt March had left her, Jo Bhaer has established a new school for her two sons, Robby and Teddy, nephews (Franz, Emil, Demi-John), niece (Daisy) and a gang of orphaned children, including Annie "Nan" Harding and a rough, street-wise adolescent named Dan. With the experience of a model childhood and a faithful and caring husband, Jo guides her pupils in their young lives; with song, music and play, the children are led through the joys and sorrows of life, work and play, rewards and punishments, getting involved in all sorts of mischief and adventure.

Cast and characters
Bhaer family
Annie "Nan" Harding (voiced by Hazuru Matsukura): The main character of this anime.
Josephine "Jo" Bhaer (née March) (voiced by Eiko Yamada): Second main character of this anime.
Fritz Bhaer (voiced by Yōsuke Akimoto): Jo's husband.
Robin "Rob" Bhaer (voiced by Yuriko Fuchizaki): Jo and Friedrich's five-year-old son.
Theodore "Teddy" Bhaer (voiced by Kyōko Minaimi): Jo and Friedrich's three-year-old son.

Brooke family
Margaret "Meg" Brooke (née March) (voiced by Keiko Han): Jo's eldest sister, John Brooke's wife, and Daisy and Demi's mother.
John Brooke (voiced by Toshihiko Kojima): Meg's husband and Laurie's former teacher, he dies.
Margaret "Daisy" Brooke: John and Meg's daughter, and Demi's twin sister.
John "Demi" Brooke: John and Meg's son, and Daisy's twin brother.
Josephine "Josie" Brooke: John and Meg Brooke's two-year-old daughter, Jo and Friedrich's niece, and Daisy and Demi's sister.

Laurence family
Amy Curtis Laurence (née March) : Amy attends the funeral of Meg's husband, John.
Theodore "Laurie/Teddy" Laurence (voiced by Nobuo Tobita): Amy's husband and good friend of Jo.

Others
Nathaniel "Nat" Blake:
Jack Ford (voiced by Tsutomu Kashiwakura):A boy who stole Tommy's money and ran away, leaving a letter confessing of his crime.
Franz Hoffman: One of Fritz's nephews.
Emil Hoffman: Franz's fourteen-year-old brother.
Ned Barker:
George "Stuffy" Cole: An overweight boy.
Daniel "Dan" Kean (voiced by Nobutoshi Hayashi): A friend of Nat.
Mary-Ann (voiced by Kayoko Fujii):
Tommy Bangs (voiced by Minami Takayama):
Asia:
Silas:
Dr. Faust:

Broadcast
Jo's Boys aired on Fuji Television from 17 January 1993 to 19 December 1993 as part of Nippon Animation's World Masterpiece Theater.

Alternative Titles
As Mulherzinhas II (Portuguese)
Little Men
Little Women 2
Los chicos de Jo (Spanish)
Missis Jo und ihre fröhliche Familie (German)
Petite bonne femme (French)
Tale of Young Grass: Nan and Miss Jo
Una classe di monelli per Jo (Italian)
Wakakusa Monogatari Nan to Jou Sensei (Japanese)
Маленькие женщины (Russian)
نوار (Arabic)
جني (Arabic)
新小婦人 (Chinese (Taiwan))
若草物語 ナンとジョー先生 (Japanese)

Music
The opening theme ("Ashita mo otenki") is performed by Akiko Kosaka.

Episode list and original air dates in 1993
 Welcome to Plumfield (January 17)
 Rivers and fields are the best classrooms! (January 24)
 Picking strawberries and the dark forest (January 31)
 The appointed box (February 7)
 The violinist's performance (February 14)
 Tommy Bang's business (February 21)
 I am Robinson Crusoe (February 28)
 First time making pumpkin pies (March 7)
 Gift for the toy king (March 14)
 The big war in pajamas (March 21)
 The rotten youth from town Dan (April 18)
 Plumfield's thunderstorm (April 25)
 Duel! Emil got angry (May 2)
 Dan and Teddy's secret (May 9)
 Buttercup's mayhem (May 23)
 The school's on fire! (May 30)
 So long, Dan! (June 6)
 Mother's here (June 13)
 Welcome to the dance (June 20)
 If we grow up what shall we be? (June 27)
 Please hit the teacher! (July 11)
 Letter from Mr. Page (August 1)
 The abandoned flower garden (August 8)
 Afraid to freely speak (August 15)
 Establishing a museum (August 22)
 I am not the thief! (August 29)
 Broken friendships (September 5)
 Words of explanation (September 12)
 Won't lose to a boy! (September 19)
 Clock sounds of a little wedding (September 26)
 Best way to use five dollars (October 17)
 I want to be a doctor! (October 24)
 Regarding father's decision (October 31)
 The ambassador on a snowy day (November 7)
 In the middle of a blizzard (November 14)
 Dan searches for a strong horse (November 21)
 Premonitions of going on a journey (November 28)
 Everybody's decisions (December 5)
 Naughty Jo riding a bicycle (December 12)
 Goodbye, Plumfield! (December 19)

External links

1993 anime television series debuts
1993 Japanese television series endings
1990s school television series
World Masterpiece Theater series
Works based on Little Women
Little Men